was a Japanese actor. He received the Kinema Junpo Award for Best Actor and the Mainichi Film Concours for Best Actor for his performance in Fires on the Plain.

Biography
Born Eijirō Funakoshi on 17 March 1923, in Tokyo, Eiji Funakoshi signed up for the Daiei Motion Picture Company in 1947 and made his acting debut the following year with Beautiful Enemy. In a career that spanned three decades Funakoshi starred in a variety of genres and worked for directors Kōzaburō Yoshimura, Mikio Naruse, Kon Ichikawa and Yasuzo Masumura.

Funakoshi was a favorite actor of internationally renowned director Kon Ichikawa. Perhaps their most notable film was the World War II drama Fires on the Plain (Nobi, 1959). Funakoshi played the lead role of Imperial Army Private Tamura, a soldier stationed on Leyte Island in the Philippines. Fires on the Plain won awards in Japan and overseas, including prizes for Kon Ichikawa from the Blue Ribbon in Japan and the Locarno Film Festival in Switzerland.

For several years, Funakoshi portrayed Tanokura Magobei, a close associate of the shogun, on Abarenbō Shōgun.

His son Eiichirō Funakoshi is also a famous actor in Japan.

Eiji Funakoshi died of a stroke on 17 March 2007, his 84th birthday.

Filmography

Honours
Medal with Purple Ribbon (1989)
Order of the Rising Sun, 4th Class, Gold Rays with Rosette (1995)

References

External links
 

1923 births
2007 deaths
Japanese male actors
Recipients of the Medal with Purple Ribbon
Recipients of the Order of the Rising Sun, 4th class